The executive branch of the government of Puerto Rico is responsible for executing the laws of Puerto Rico, as well as causing them to be executed. Article IV of the Constitution of Puerto Rico vests the executive power on the Governor—whom by its nature forms the executive branch.

The Constitution also establishes that the Secretary of State should serve as acting governor when the Governor is unable to perform his duties. The Secretary of State, therefore, performs an equivalent role to that of a Lieutenant Governor in United States politics.

The Puerto Rico Chief of Staff is second-in-command and manages and oversees all executive departments and almost all executive agencies.

Article IV also establishes that the Governor shall be assisted by Secretaries whom shall collectively constitute the Governor's advisory council and be designated as the Council of Secretaries. The Council, together with the Cabinet-level officers, compose the Cabinet of Puerto Rico.

The Constitution created eight executive departments. Later on, the Legislative Assembly reorganized one of these, and created and reorganized a few more. Today, the executive branch is composed of fifteen executive departments each headed by a Secretary.

Executive posts

Governor

Article IV of the Constitution of Puerto Rico vests the executive power on the Governor. The Governor has a duty to enforce state laws, to convene the Legislative Assembly, the power to either approve or veto bills passed by the Legislative Assembly, to appoint government officers, to appoint Justices, and to grant pardons.

Lieutenant Governor

Puerto Rico does not have a post for lieutenant governor but the Secretary of State performs an equivalent role. Article IV of the Constitution of Puerto Rico establishes that the Secretary of State should serve as acting governor when the Governor is unable to perform his duties. The Constitution and Puerto Rican law establishes a governmental line of succession for special cases when neither the Governor nor the Secretary are available.

Chief of Staff

Neither the Constitution of Puerto Rico nor Puerto Rican law provide for a Chief of Staff position. However, Governors proclaim an executive order establishing the post for the Puerto Rico Chief of Staff who is charged with managing and overseeing all executive departments and almost all executive agencies.

Executive offices

The executive branch is led by the Office of the Governor of Puerto Rico which consists of the immediate staff to the Governor as well as multiple levels of support. All other executive offices are ascribed to the Office of the Governor. The Governor, however, delegates the management and overwatch of almost all the executive offices to the Secretariat of Governance and the Chief of Staff; being the Office of Management and Budget and the Planning Board the only executive offices that report directly to the Governor. The executive offices are comprised by:

 Environmental Quality Board
 Office of Management and Budget
 Office of the Governor of Puerto Rico
 Planning Board
 Secretariat of Governance

Secretaries

Article IV of the Constitution of Puerto Rico establishes that the Governor shall be assisted by Secretaries whom shall collectively constitute the Governor's advisory council and be designated as the Council of Secretaries. These Secretaries and other officers which hold positions at the same bureaucratic level compose the Cabinet.  On rare occasions, the Cabinet is called upon to ratify a gubernatorial decision, such as the appointment of a member of the board of the Puerto Rico Government Development Bank, in lieu of the Senate's advice and consent.

All Cabinet members are nominated by the Governor and then presented to the Senate for advice and consent by a simple majorityexcept for the Secretary of State who requires the advice and consent of both the Senate and the House of Representatives. If the Cabinet members are confirmed they are sworn in and begin their duties immediately afterwards. However, Cabinet members appointed during a legislative recess may begin serving immediately under a recess appointment until the end of the following regular session of the Legislative Assembly, or rejected by the Senate, whichever occurs first, should they not be confirmed. All members leading executive departments receive the title of Secretary.

The Council of Secretaries is the group composed by the heads of the executive departments of the government of Puerto Rico. The Council is charged with leading the different sectors of public administration within the government and is comprised by:

 Secretary of Agriculture
 Secretary of Consumer Affairs
 Secretary of Corrections and Rehabilitation
 Secretary of Economic Development and Commerce
 Secretary of Education
 Secretary of Family Affairs
 Secretary of Health
 Secretary of Housing
 Secretary of Justice
 Secretary of Labor and Human Resources
 Secretary of Natural and Environmental Resources
 Secretary of Public Safety
 Secretary of Sports and Recreation
 Secretary of State
 Secretary of Transportation and Public Works
 Secretary of Treasury

Departments
There are currently fifteen executive departments; all of them equivalent to that of ministries in parliamentary systems. Each executive department is responsible of a specific sector of public administration and provides a related public service to the citizens of Puerto Rico. All departments are capable of generating revenue through the issuance of fines, or through the collection of license fees and taxes. These revenues are then allocated to the government's primary operating fund: the Puerto Rico General Fund. The current departments are:

 Department of Agriculture
 Department of Consumer Affairs
 Department of Corrections and Rehabilitation
 Department of Economic Development and Commerce
 Department of Education
 Department of Family Affairs
 Department of Health
 Department of Housing
 Department of Justice
 Department of Labor and Human Resources
 Department of Natural and Environmental Resources
 Department of Public Safety
 Department of Sports and Recreation
 Department of State
 Department of Transportation and Public Works
 Department of Treasury

Cabinet-level officers

The Cabinet-level officers of the executive branch of the government of Puerto Rico are the heads of the executive agencies that report directly to the Governor of Puerto Rico or to the Chief of Staff who also happen to not be Secretaries of an executive department nor members of an executive officeexcept for the Directors of the Office of Management and Budget and the Planning Board who are considered Cabinet-level officers. All the Cabinet-level officers are at the same bureaucratic level as of the Secretaries and together with the Council of Secretaries compose the Cabinet of Puerto Rico.

 Chief of Staff
 Commissioner of Safety and Public Protection
 Director of the Office of Management and Budget
 Director of the Puerto Rico Federal Affairs Administration
 Inspector General of Puerto Rico
 President of the Planning Board
 President of the Puerto Rico Government Development Bank

Fiscal agent and financing

The fiscal agent and financing agencies are a group of government-owned corporations of Puerto Rico that manage all aspects of financing for the executive branch. The Puerto Rico Government Development Bank Act establishes that the Puerto Rico Government Development Bank (GDB) serves as the fiscal agent of the government of Puerto Rico. Regardless of its special status, the GDB and all other financing agencies report to the Secretariat of Governance and the Chief of Staff. These agencies are comprised by:

 Authority for the Financing of Housing
 Authority for the Financing of Industrial, Touristic, Educative, Medical, and Environmental Control Facilities (AFICA)
 Authority for the Financing of the Infrastructure of Puerto Rico
 Economic Development Bank
 Government Development Bank
 Municipal Financing Agency
 Public Financing Corporation
 Public-Private Partnerships Authority
 Urgent Interest Fund Corporation (COFINA)

Government-owned corporations

The government-owned corporations of Puerto Rico are autonomous, independent, and self-sufficient legal entities owned entirely or in large by the executive branch. These corporations engage in commercial activities with their revenues ultimately being allocated towards the government's treasury: the Puerto Rico Consolidated Fund. As of December 2012, the executive branch owned 50 government-owned corporations as follows:

 Automobile Accident Compensation Administration
 Agricultural Insurance Corporation
 Aqueducts and Sewers Authority
 Authority for the Financing of Housing
 Authority for the Financing of Industrial, Touristic, Educative, Medical, and Environmental Control Facilities (AFICA)
 Authority for the Financing of the Infrastructure of Puerto Rico
 Caño Martín Peña ENLACE Project Corporation
 Cardiovascular Center of Puerto Rico and the Caribbean Corporation
 Commission on Traffic Safety
 Comprehensive Cancer Center
 Conservatory of Music Corporation
 Convention Center District Authority
 Corporation for the Development of Arts, Sciences, and Cinematographic Industry
 Corporation for Industries for the Blind, Mentally Retarded People, and Other Handicapped People
 Credit Unions Supervision and Insurance Corporation
 Economic Development Bank
 Electric Power Authority
 Government Development Bank
 Health Insurance Administration
 Highways and Transportation Authority
 Industrial Development Company
 Integral Development for the Cantera Peninsula Company
 Institute of Puerto Rican Culture
 Lands Administration
 Lands Authority
 Maritime Shipping Authority
 Medical Services Administration
 Metropolitan Bus Authority
 Municipal Financing Agency
 Musical Arts Corporation
 Musical Scenic Arts Corporation
 National Guard Institutional Trust
 National Parks Company
 Performing Arts Center Corporation
 Ports Authority
 Port of the Americas Administration
 Public Broadcasting Corporation
 Public Buildings Authority
 Sales Tax Financing Corporation
 School of Plastic Arts
 Solid Waste Management Authority
 State Insurance Fund Corporation
 Symphony Orchestra Corporation
 Trade and Export Company
 Tourism Company
 Training and Work Enterprises Corporation
 University of Puerto Rico

Other agencies
There are other agencies that belong to the executive branch that aren't either executive offices, executive departments, subagencies, nor government-owned corporations. These agencies tend to be regulatory bodies or agencies that provide some sort of public service whose goal is not commercial profit. Regardless of their purpose, these agencies report to the Secretariat of Governance and the Chief of Staff, and some of them are even presided by a cabinet-level officer. This group of agencies is comprised by:

 Administration of the Retirement Systems of Employees of the Government of the Commonwealth of Puerto Rico and the Judicature
 Appeals Commission on Public Service
 Commission on Cooperative Development
 Commission on Investigation, Prosecution, and Appeal
 Commission on Public Service
 Commission on Safety and Public Protection
 Education Council
 Federal Affairs Administration
 General Services Administration
 Industrial Commission
 Institute of Statistics
 Labour Relations Board
 Office of Government Ethics
 Office of the Commissioner of Financial Institutions
 Office of the Commissioner of Municipal Affairs
 Office of the Electoral Comptroller
 Office of the Special Independent Prosecutor's Panel
 Office of the Solicitor General
 Office of Training and Advice in Labour and Human Resource Management
 Review Board of Permits and Land Use
 State Agency for Emergency and Disaster Management
 State Elections Commission
 Teachers Retirement System
 Telecommunications Regulatory Board

Notes

References

 
Government of Puerto Rico